The Mediterranean recluse spider (Loxosceles rufescens) is a species of spider that originated in the Mediterranean region as its name implies, but can now be found in many parts of the world and is listed as one of the most invasive spiders world-wide. Usually dwelling in caves, the spiders will also inhabit basements and tunnels. Their webs shelter their egg sacs, which hatch into young that molt as they grow. The spider hunts at night and eats species including silverfish and cockroaches, and they usually target smaller insects.

Similar to other species in their genus, bites from L. rufescens can cause necrosis and, for some individuals, systemic damage due to the enzyme sphingomyelinase D. Pest control may be undertaken with similar strategies as used for the brown recluse spider.

Characteristics 
L. rufescens is a cave dwelling arachnid that is nearly indistinguishable in appearance to Loxosceles reclusa, the brown recluse spider. Individuals can be identified as a medium sized spider distinguished by three pairs of two eyes organized in the shape of a triangle (spiders commonly have 8 eyes), with a violin shaped pattern on their cephalothorax. This spider belongs to the genus Loxosceles which contains many of the most dangerous spiders in the world. Both male and females grow to approximately 7-7.5 mm in length.

L. rufescens egg sacs contain approximately 40 eggs that each take a few weeks to hatch, depending on the temperature. The young spiders grow slowly and produce molts during its growing phase. These molts often have a pale ghostly appearance. Mediterranean recluse spiders typically live from one to three years. The webs Mediterranean recluse spiders spin function as a daytime hiding spot and provide seclusion for the egg sacs. The webs are very thin and fragile, formed by strands of silk laid in a disorganized manner.

Distribution and habitat 
The Mediterranean recluse is listed as one of the most invasive species in the world. It is native to the Mediterranean area and western Asia, including parts of Europe and Northern Africa, and prefers warm temperatures and generally dry weather. Today, this spider has a global distribution due to increased human travel and the increase of transported goods. In areas where L. rufescens are non-native, they can be found in semi-arid environments and damp areas such as basements, caves, and tunnels. In these locations individuals are able to find their favorable meal of cockroaches and silverfish.

This species was recorded in caves in Iran in 2013. During a routine building pest check in 2021, spiders of this species were found in the basement of the University of Michigan's Shapiro Undergraduate Library, which led to its closure for two days.

Ecology 
L. rufescens differ from many other spider species in their predatory behavior. L. rufescens is an active hunter and will set out at night to capture and kill a variety of arthropods that are susceptible to their venom rather than catching them in a web. They are most active at night and typically target smaller insects because of their vulnerable soft exoskeleton. Males are more prolific hunters than female individuals partly due to their simultaneous search for a potential mate.

Threat to humans 
Spiders in the Loxosceles genus are well known for their bite, causing skin necrosis and for some people, causing great damage and widespread, systemic effects. This is referred to as "loxoscelism". The necrosis is due to the unique enzyme, sphingomyelinase D (SMase D). This enzyme from the Loxesceles venom alters the structure of the membrane raft, leading to protease activation on the membrane. This ultimately results in proteolytic cleavage of cell surface proteins and necrosis of the cell. Most cases are medically insignificant, but in some cases, from 2 to 8 hours after a bite, there may be penetrating pain followed by a burning sensation. Areas adjacent to the bite often become red and painful due to vasospasm and ischemia. A blister may form which often changes to a dark blue color with a sunken center days following the bite. In rare cases, hemolysis, intravascular coagulation, and thrombocytopenia can occur, leading to renal failure.

Control and mitigation 
Controlling Loxoceles species populations within dwellings can be challenging as they prefer to dwell in small, dark crevices.  This is exacerbated by their ability to survive without food and water for extended periods of time. There are no published control or mitigation efforts specifically directed to the Mediterranean recluse spider population, except for the mention of the need for further such efforts in a study conducted in Washington, DC. However, with the indistinguishable features between the brown recluse and Mediterranean recluse spiders, efforts to control the brown recluse spider may be translated into mitigating the Mediterranean recluse population. Many of these efforts may include regular pest control and vacuuming of dead insects, sanitizing, removal of spider webs, the use of glue traps and insecticides.

Gallery

References

External links

Sicariidae
Cosmopolitan spiders